Menegazzia weindorferi is a species of foliose lichen found in Australia. It was originally described by Austrian botanist Alexander Zahlbruckner as a species of Parmelia in 1907. Rolf Santesson transferred it to Menegazzia in 1942.

Distribution
Menegazzia weindorferi is a southern Australian species with records of occurrence in Victoria and Tasmania

See also
List of Menegazzia species

References

weindorferi
Lichen species
Lichens described in 1917
Lichens of Australia
Taxa named by Alexander Zahlbruckner